Juraj Maretić (born 5 June 1993 in Split) is a Croatian football forward, currently playing for Junak Sinj in the Druga HNL, on loan from Slaven Belupo.

External links

Juraj Maretić at Sportnet.hr 

1993 births
Living people
Footballers from Split, Croatia
Association football forwards
Croatian footballers
NK Slaven Belupo players
NK Junak Sinj players
NK Hrvace players
NK Imotski players
Croatian Football League players
First Football League (Croatia) players